IPSA-3 Airport is a small airport located in an oil complex about  southwest of Hafar al-Batin in the Eastern Province of Saudi Arabia. The airport serves a pump station along the Iraqi Pipeline in Saudi Arabia (IPSA).

Facilities
The airport has one runway, 1,831 meters long and 30 meters wide, with lights.

Airports in Saudi Arabia